Darrell or Darell Brown may refer to:

Darrell Brown (baseball) (born 1955), former Major League Baseball outfielder
Darrell Brown (musician), American songwriter
Darrel Brown (born 1984), sprinter from Trinidad and Tobago
Darrel Brown (basketball) (1923–1990), American basketball player